Nantenaina Ramalalaharivololona (born 10 July 1987 in Antananarivo) is a Malagasy tennis player.

Ramalalaharivololona has won one doubles title on the ITF tour in her career. On 20 December 2014, she peaked at world number 916 in the doubles rankings.

Playing for Madagascar at the Fed Cup, Ramalalaharivololona has a win-loss record of 4–6.

Ramalalaharivololona retired from tennis in 2017.

ITF finals

Doubles: 1 (1–0)

Fed Cup participation

Singles

Doubles

References

External links 
 
 
 

1987 births
Living people
People from Antananarivo
Malagasy sportspeople
Malagasy female tennis players